The Denmark national badminton team is a badminton team located in Denmark and represents the nation of Denmark in international badminton team competitions. It is controlled by Badminton Denmark, the governing body for badminton in Denmark.

Summer Olympic Games

List of medalists

Participation in BWF competitions

Thomas Cup 

Uber Cup 

Sudirman Cup

Participation in European Team Badminton Championships

Men's team

Women's team

Mixed team

Participation in European Junior Team Badminton Championships
Mixed Team

Current squad 
The following players were selected to represent Denmark at the 2022 Thomas & Uber Cup.

Male players
Viktor Axelsen
Anders Antonsen
Rasmus Gemke
Hans-Kristian Vittinghus
Victor Svendsen
Kim Astrup
Anders Skaarup Rasmussen
Rasmus Kjær
Lasse Mølhede
Jeppe Bay
Mathias Christiansen
Frederik Søgaard
Female players
Mia Blichfeldt
Line Christophersen
Line Kjærsfeldt
Julie Dawall Jakobsen
Sara Thygesen
Maiken Fruergaard
Amalie Magelund
Alexandra Bøje
Amalie Schulz
Rikke Søby Hansen

References

Badminton
National badminton teams
Badminton in Denmark